Events in the year 1935 in Brazil.

Incumbents

Federal government 
 President: Getúlio Vargas 
 Vice President: none

Governors 
 Alagoas: 
 till 26 March: Osman Laurel 
 26 March-10 May: Edgar de Góis Monteiro
 10 May-27 May: Benedito Augusto da Silva
 till 27 May: Osman Laurel
 Amazonas: Nélson de Melo (till 19 February); Álvaro Botelho Maia (from 19 February)
 Bahia: Juracy Magalhães
 Ceará: 
 till 10 May: Filipe Moreira Lima
 10 May-25 May: Franklin Monteiro Gondim
 from 25 May: Francisco de Meneses Pimentel
 Espírito Santo: João Punaro Bley
 Goiás:
 till 26 September: Pedro Ludovico Teixeira
 26 September-20 October: Taciano Gomes de Mello
 starting 21 October: Pedro Ludovico Teixeira
 Maranhão:
 till 22 July: Antônio Martins de Almeida
 from 22 July: Aquiles Lisboa
 Mato Grosso: César de Mesquita Serva then Fenelon Müller then Newton Deschamps Cavalcanti then Mário Correia da Costa
 Minas Gerais: Benedito Valadares Ribeiro
 Pará: 
 till 12 April: Joaquim de Magalhães Barata
 12 April-4 May: Roberto Carneiro
 from 4 May: José Carneiro da Gama Malcher
 Paraíba: José Marques da Silva Mariz (till 21 January);  (from 21 January)
 Paraná: Manuel Ribas
 Pernambuco:
 till 12 October: Carlos de Lima Cavalcanti
 12 October-6 December: Antônio Vicente de Andrade Bezerra
 from 6 December: Carlos de Lima Cavalcanti
 Piauí: Landry Sales (till 3 May); Leônidas Melo (from 3 May)
 Rio Grande do Norte: 
 till 27 October: Mario Leopoldo Pereira da Camera
 27 October-29 October: Liberato da Cruz Barroso
 from 29 October: Rafael Fernandes Gurjão
 Rio Grande do Sul: José Antônio Flores da Cunha
 Santa Catarina: Aristiliano Ramos (till 1 May); Nereu Ramos (from 1 May)
 São Paulo: Armando de Sales Oliveira
 Sergipe: 
 till 28 March: Augusto Maynard Gomes
 28 March-2 April: Aristides Napoleão de Carvalho
 from 2 April: Erônides de Carvalho

Vice governors 
 Rio Grande do Norte: no vice governor
 São Paulo: no vice governor

Events 
8 June – The Brazilian Olympic Committee, officially founded in 1914, is recognised and begins activities.
 20 September – the Farroupilha Revolution centennial fair opens
November – A Communist insurrection, the "Red Revolt of 35", fails to unseat President Vargas.  Olga Benário Prestes and her husband Luís Carlos Prestes are among the conspirators arrested.
date unknown 
The chemical company Nitro Química is established.
Mário de Andrade and writer and archaeologist Paulo Duarte, who had for many years desired to promote cultural research and activity in the city through a municipal agency, create a unified São Paulo Department of Culture (Departamento de Cultura e Recreação da Prefeitura Municipal de São Paulo), with Andrade as founding director.

Arts and culture

Books
Jorge Amado – Jubiabá
Tatsuzō Ishikawa – Sōbō
Érico Veríssimo – A Vida de Joana D'Arc

Films
Alô, Alô, Brasil
Estudantes
Fazendo Fitas

Births 
19 January – Maria Alice Vergueiro, actress (d. 2020)
1 July – Geraldo Magela, politician
14 July – Durval Guimarães, sport shooter
1 August – José Hamilton Ribeiro, journalist
19 August – Tereza Rachel, actress (d. 2016)
5 October – Tarcísio Meira, actor
27 October – Maurício de Sousa, cartoonist
13 December – Adélia Prado, poet and author

Deaths 
8 February – Otávio Fantoni, soccer player (born 1907; infection resulting from a sporting injury)
15 February – Ronald de Carvalho, poet and diplomat (born 1893)
14 April – Antônio Castilho de Alcântara Machado, journalist, politician and writer (born 1901)
24 June – Alfredo Le Pera, journalist, dramatist and lyricist (born 1900)
date unknown – Arturo Carrari, film director (born 1867)

References

See also 
1935 in Brazilian football
List of Brazilian films of 1935

 
1930s in Brazil
Years of the 20th century in Brazil
Brazil
Brazil